Glebe Farm 40B is a shared First Nations reserve within the city of Brantford. It is shared between the Bay of Quinte Mohawks, Bearfoot Onondaga, Delaware, Konadaha Seneca, Lower Cayuga, Lower Mohawk, Niharondasa Seneca, Oneida, Onondaga Clear Sky, Tuscarora, Upper Cayuga, Upper Mohawk & Walker Mohawk First Nations.

Cayuga
Communities in the County of Brant
Indian reserves in Ontario
Lenape
Mohawk tribe
Oneida
Onondaga
Seneca tribe
Tuscarora